Sulenus is a genus of longhorn beetles of the subfamily Lamiinae, containing the following species:

 Sulenus humeralis Lacordaire, 1872
 Sulenus macrophthalmus Breuning, 1954
 Sulenus vadoni Breuning, 1957

References

Desmiphorini